Jusaburō Tsujimura (1 November 1933 – 5 February 2023) was a Japanese puppeteer, puppet and doll maker, and art director.

Early life 
Tsujimura was born on 1 November 1933 in Chaoyang, Jinzhou Province, Manchukuo, where he spent his early childhood. He moved to Japan in 1944, and lived in Hiroshima for almost a year, leaving just before the nuclear bomb was dropped on the city to move to Miyoshi, Hiroshima – his mother's hometown and the site of what is now his museum. At 22, his mother died, which spurred his move back to Tokyo. He began his career in Ningyōza puppet troupes, and making stage props for the kabuki theatre with the Fujinami Company. He eventually left this job in 1959, resolved to create dolls full time.

Career 
At 22, his mother died, which spurred his move back to Tokyo. He began his career in Ningyōza puppet troupes, and making stage props for the kabuki theatre with the Fujinami Company. He eventually left this job in 1959, resolved to create dolls full time. He created 300 puppets for a television serial drama, The Story of the Eight Dogs, starting in 1973 – bringing him fame and attention. From here he began to create his own original dolls and puppets. He became known to audiences in the west after his success as the art director and costume designer for Yukio Ninagawa's productions of both Medea and Macbeth. 

Mae Smethurst's review of Medea provides formal analyses of Tsujimura's costumes that acknowledge his visual references to kabuki theatre:

In his costumes for Macbeth, Tsujimura designed color-coded period costumes. For instance, in the banquet scene, Macbeth and Lady Macbeth bond through love and guilt, and wear matching red and green robes with identical hairstyling. 

Though he primarily made dolls and puppets, he has also made daruma wood carvings and other small toys and figurines from wood.

Death
Tsujimura died of heart failure on 5 February 2023, at the age of 89.

Exhibitions 
In 1992 he had a solo retrospective that toured Japan and traveled internationally to be shown at the New York Public Library. In 2014 he had a solo exhibition of his work at the Sano Art Museum.

Legacy

Jusaburō Tsujimura Doll Museum 
The Jusaburō Tsujimura Doll Museum is in Miyoshi, Hiroshima. In 1951, the building changed from a bank to a post office. In 1981 it became the Miyoshi City History and Folklore museum. In 2013, it became the Jusaburō Tsujimura Doll Museum, although its second floor remains dedicated to the folklore of Miyoshi.

Publications 
A 152 page monograph of his work was published by Asahi Shinbunsha in 1992.

References 

1933 births
2023 deaths
People from Chaoyang, Liaoning
Puppet designers
Japanese puppeteers
Dollmakers
Japanese art directors
Artists from Tokyo
Bunraku